Muhammad Said al-Qaddal (Arabic: محمد سعيد القدال) was a Sudanese intellectual and historian whose research and views are distinguished for their depth and clarity, particularly the ones regarding the history of certain Sudanese religious communities and ideological parties, as well as his research on the field of educational curriculum.

Life 
Muhammad Said al-Qaddal was born in 1935 in Sinkat, eastern Sudan, where he was taught the Quran. His father, Sheikh al-Qaddal, was seconded to work in Hadhramaut, Yemen, therefore, al-Qaddal and his family moved there, and it is where he studied middle school.

Education 
al-Qaddal studied at:

 Khartoum State primary schools.
 Faculty of Arts, University of Khartoum, 1958.
 Master's degree at University of California.
 Ph.D. in Modern History of Sudan from University of Khartoum.

Career 

 History Assistant Inspector, Ministry of Education: 1966–1969
 Head of the Department of History, Higher Teachers' Institute: 1970–1972
 Lecturer: Department of History, University of Khartoum: 1982–1986
 Associate Lecturer, University of Khartoum: 1987–1992
 Associate Lecturer, University of Aden: 1993–2000
 Associate Lecturer, University of Khartoum: 2000–2003
 Professor, University of Khartoum: 2004

Research papers 

 World Conference on History of Mahdist War, University of Khartoum: 1981
 Postgraduate Studies of Arab Universities, University of Khartoum: 1982
 Hundred Years after the Berlin Conference 1884, Makerere University, Uganda: 1984
 Rewriting Arab History, Union of Arab Historians, Baghdad: 1984
 Social-Change in Africa, Harare, Zimbabwe: 1986
 Society of the Revival of Islamic Heritage, University of Aden: 1992
 Egyptian-Sudanese Relations, Cairo: 1997
 Western-Arab Relations, Philadelphia University, Jordan: 2003
 Development of Faculty of Arts’ Curriculum, Hodeidah University, Yemen: 2004
 The Hadhrami Migration to Southeast Asia, Kuala Lumpur: 2005

Works 

 Education during the National Democratic Revolution Phase: 1970
 The Mahdist State and Abyssinia (original: al-Mahdiyah wa-al-Habashah): 1973
 Sudanese Communist Party and the 1969 Sudanese coup d'état: 1985
 Imam al-Mahdi: A Painting of a Sudanese Rebel (original: al-Imam al-Mahdi: Lawha li-tha`ir sudani): 1986
 The Economic Policy of the Mahdist State: 1987
 Islam and Politics in Sudan (original: Al-Islam wa-al-siyasiyyah fi al-Sudan) (book): 1992
 Belonging and Alienation: Studies in the History of Sudan: 1992
 History of Modern Sudan (original: Ta'rikh al-Sudan al-hadith): 1993
 Sheikh al-Qaddal Pasha: A Sudanese Teacher in Hadhramaut (original: Al-Shaykh al-Qaddal Basha): 1997
 Sultan Ali Bin Salah al-Qu'aiti: Half a Century of Political Struggle in Hadhramaut: 1998
 Cooper: Memoirs of a Political Detainee in Sudan Prisons: 1997
 Milestones in the History of the Sudanese Communist Party: 1999
 Guide to the Modern History of Europe: From the Renaissance Period to World War II: 2000
 Guide to Writing University Research: 2000
 Sheikh Mustafa al-Amin: A Journey of a Lifetime from Abyssinia to Hamburg: 2003

Death 
On January 6, 2008, at the age of 73, al-Qaddal died following a health emergency in Khartoum, Sudan, and was buried there.

References 

Sudanese novelists
Sudanese politicians
21st-century Sudanese politicians
Sudanese journalists
Arab historians